Gunnar Nilsson (19 August 1889 – 8 March 1948) was a Swedish athlete. He competed in the men's discus throw at the 1912 Summer Olympics.

References

1889 births
1948 deaths
Athletes (track and field) at the 1912 Summer Olympics
Swedish male discus throwers
Olympic athletes of Sweden
Place of birth missing